Ingrid de Caluwé (born 27 May 1967, in Luxembourg) is a Dutch politician. As a member of the People's Party for Freedom and Democracy (Volkspartij voor Vrijheid en Democratie) she was a member of the House of Representatives between 1 June 2011 and 23 March 2017, not seeking reelection during the general election, 2017. She focused on matters of development aid, aviation, harbors and ship transport. De Caluwé studied law at Leiden University.

References

External links 
  Ingrid de Caluwé personal website
  People's Party for Freedom and Democracy biography

1967 births
Living people
Dutch women jurists
Dutch human resource management people
Leiden University alumni
Members of the House of Representatives (Netherlands)
People from Luxembourg City
People's Party for Freedom and Democracy politicians
21st-century Dutch politicians
21st-century Dutch women politicians